Colony Square Mall is an enclosed shopping mall in Zanesville, Ohio. Opened in 1981, the anchor stores are Cinemark Theatres, Dunham's Sports, Planet Fitness, TJ Maxx, Five Below, Jo-Ann Fabrics, and JCPenney. There is 1 vacant anchor store that was once Elder-Beerman. It is owned by Time Equities, Inc.

History
On July 20 1995, Lowe's Home Improvement opened in the mall's surrounding area. Then in 2006, Sam's Club opened to the public nearby.

Lazarus, an original anchor, closed in 2002. Three years later, the former building was torn down for a movie theater. Old Navy closed in 2008. Anchor store Sears closed in 2013  and the space was converted to Dunham's Sports. In January 2017 it was announced the mall had been purchased by Time Equities Inc. of New York City $31.5 million. New leases included TJ Maxx, Shoe Carnival, and Planet Fitness.

References

External links

Urban Retail property page

Shopping malls in Ohio
Shopping malls established in 1981
Buildings and structures in Zanesville, Ohio